The Roman Catholic Archdiocese of Onitsha is the Metropolitan See for the ecclesiastical province of Onitsha in Anambra State, Nigeria.

History
On 25 July 1889, the Apostolic Prefecture of Lower Niger was established out of an area that previously formed part of the larger Apostolic Vicariate of Benin Coast.

On 16 April 1920, the Prefecture was promoted as the Apostolic Vicariate of Southern Nigeria. On 9 July 1934, the Vicariate was renamed from Southern Nigeria to Onitsha-Owerri. On 12 February 1948, the Vicariate was renamed again to its present name of Onitsha.

On 18 April 1950, the Vicariate was promoted to a Metropolitan See.

Special churches
The seat of the archbishop is the Holy Trinity Basilica in Onitsha.

Bishops
 Prefects Apostolic of Lower Niger {Niger Inferiore}
 Father Léon-Alexander Lejeune, C.S.Sp. 23 May 1900 – 5 September 1905
 Father Joseph (Ignatius) Shanahan, C.S.Sp. 20 September 1905 - 16 April 1920 see belowVicars Apostolic of Southern Nigeria {Nigeria Meridionale}
 Bishop Joseph (Ignatius) Shanahan, C.S.Sp. see above 16 April 1920 - 21 May 1931
 Bishop Charles Heerey, C.S.Sp. 21 May 1931 – 9 July 1934 see below
Vicar Apostolic of Onitsha-Owerri
 Bishop Charles Heerey, C.S.Sp. see above 9 July 1934 – 12 February 1948 see below
Vicar Apostolic of Onitsha
 Bishop Charles Heerey, C.S.Sp. see above 12 February 1948 – 18 April 1950 see below
Archbishops of Onitsha
 Archbishop Charles Heerey, C.S.Sp. see above 18 April 1950 – 26 June 1967
 Archbishop Francis Arinze 1967.06.26 – 1985.03.09, already appointed Pro-Prefect of the Secretariat of Non-Christians in 1984; elevated to Cardinal in 1985
 Archbishop Stephen Nweke Ezeanya 1985.03.09 – 1995.02.25
 Archbishop Albert Kanene Obiefuna 1995.02.25 – 2003.09.01
 Archbishop Valerian Okeke since 2003.09.01

Coadjutor Bishops
Francis Arinze (1965-1967), did not have right of succession (?) but was appointed Archbishop here; future Cardinal
Charles Heerey, C.S.Sp. (1927-1931), as Coadjutor Vicar Apostolic 
Albert Kanene Obiefuna (1994-1995), as Coadjutor Archbishop
Valerian Maduka Okeke (2001-2003), as Coadjutor Archbishop

Auxiliary Bishops
John of the Cross Anyogu (1957-1962), appointed Bishop of Enugu
Denis Chidi Isizoh (2015- 2023) appointed Bishop of Aguleri
Emmanuel Otteh (1990-1996), appointed Bishop of Issele-Uku

Other priests of this diocese who became bishops
Albert Kanene Obiefuna, appointed Bishop of Awka in 1977; later returned here as Coadjutor
Hilary Paul Odili Okeke, appointed Bishop of Nnewi in 2001
Jude Thaddeus Okolo (priest here 1983–2001), appointed nuncio and titular archbishop in 2008
Mark Onwuha Unegbu (priest here, 1944–1948), appointed Bishop of Owerri in 1970

Suffragan dioceses
 Abakaliki 
 Aguleri
 Awgu
 Awka 
Ekwulobia
 Enugu 
 Nnewi 
 Nsukka

Schools
Queen of the Rosary College, Onitsha 
Regina Pacis Secondary,Onitsha 
Mater Amabilis Secondary school, Umuoji 
St. KizitoSecondaryschool, Umudioka
St. Charles College, Onitsha 
Christ the king College, Onitsha 
Michael Tansi Memorial Secondary School, Aguleri

See also
 Roman Catholicism in Nigeria

References

Sources
 GCatholic.org
 Roman Catholic Archdiocese of Onitsha, official website
 Catholic-Hierarchy page about Onitsha
 

Roman Catholic dioceses in Nigeria
Roman
Roman Catholic Archdiocese of Onitsha
Roman Catholic Archdiocese of Onitsha
Roman Catholic Ecclesiastical Province of Onitsha